Shch-317 was a  of the Soviet Navy. Her keel was laid down by A. Marti in Leningrad on 23 July 1934. She was launched on 24 September 1935 and commissioned on 29 September 1936 in the Baltic Fleet.

Service history
During the 1942 campaign, the submarine was under the command of Captain Mokhov Nikolay Konstantinovich and took part in the Soviet submarine campaign on 1942 in Baltic Sea. Shch-317 scored victories, all of them in the summer 1942. The submarine torpedoed and damaged the Danish merchant Orion (2,405 GRT) on 19 June 1942, but did not sink the cargo vessel. She scored most of her success against the German-Swedish iron ore shipping lines, which was the main target of 1942 Soviet submarine campaign.

Loss
While returning home after the successful campaign of summer 1942, Shch-317  was sunk. On the last mission, the submarine division commander Captain 2nd Rank V.A. Yegorov was also on board. The most likely cause of the sinking was an blow up on seeigel minefield circa 18.07.1942.

Wreck discovery
UMEX (Underwater Exploration Team) divers located the wreck of Shch-317 on 2 May 2018 at a depth of 255 ft. (78 meters) in the eastern part of the Gulf of Finland near Gogland.

References 

1935 ships
Shchuka-class submarines
Ships built in the Soviet Union
World War II submarines of the Soviet Union
Maritime incidents in July 1942
World War II shipwrecks in the Baltic Sea
Ships sunk by mines